Bindal may refer to:

People
Bindal people, an Indigenous Australian people of the state of North Queensland
Rajeev Bindal, a former minister of health and family welfare in Himachal Pradesh, India
Rajesh Bindal, an Indian judge

Places
Bindal, a municipality in Nordland county, Norway
Bindal River, a river in Uttarakhand, India

Other
Bindal language, an extinct Australian Aboriginal language of North Queensland
Euastacus bindal, a species of southern crawfish in the family Parastacidae